A Neptune-crosser is a minor planet whose orbit crosses that of Neptune.  The dwarf planet Pluto is the most massive example of this class of object.  The known numbered Neptune-crossers (as of 2005) are:

Notes: ‡ outer-grazer
† 134340 Pluto was known at this time but not numbered

 5145 Pholus
 7066 Nessus
 10370 Hylonome
 (15788) 1993 SB
 (15820) 1994 TB
 (15875) 1996 TP66
 (19299) 1996 SZ4
 (20161) 1996 TR66
 20461 Dioretsa
 (26308) 1998 SM165 ‡
 28978 Ixion ‡
 (29981) 1999 TD10
 (32929) 1995 QY9
 (33128) 1998 BU48
 (33340) 1998 VG44
 38628 Huya
 42355 Typhon
 (44594) 1999 OX3
 (47932) 2000 GN171
 52975 Cyllarus
 (54520) 2000 PJ30
 55576 Amycus
 (55638) 2002 VE95
 (60608) 2000 EE173
 (65407) 2002 RP120
 65489 Ceto
 (73480) 2002 PN34
 (78799) 2002 XW93
 (84719) 2002 VR128
 (87269) 2000 OO67
 (87555) 2000 QB243
 (88269) 2001 KF77
 (134340) Pluto †

See also 
 List of centaurs (small Solar System bodies)
 List of Mercury-crossing minor planets
 List of Venus-crossing minor planets
 List of Earth-crossing minor planets
 List of Mars-crossing minor planets
 List of Jupiter-crossing minor planets
 List of Saturn-crossing minor planets
 List of Uranus-crossing minor planets

Neptune
Neptune-crossing
Neptune-crossing
Minor planets